Australia's Peril is a 1917 Australian silent film directed by Franklyn Barrett. It is considered a lost film.

Plot
Two German cruisers escape to the Pacific and begin to raid the Australian coast. They sink one merchant marine ship, leaving a sole survivor, Jack Rawson (Roland Conway). He drifts on a raft to an island which he discovers is an enemy munitions base and is captured. He overhears plans to raid the Australian coast and manages to escape. He is taken to Sydney but is kidnapped by a German spy, "Fred Smith" (John de Lacy). Smith ties Jack to a chair in a wooden building which he then sets on fire.

Smith helps a German raiding party land near Sydney and it starts wreaking havoc. Jack is rescued from the fire and helps fight the Germans, inspiring some workers who have gone on strike to join in the battle. He is stranded behind enemy lines when he discovers his fiancée, Marion (Maie Baird), is being held captive. He goes to rescue her and finds her being molested by Smith. Marion shoots Smith and kills him, then marries Jack.

Cast
Roland Conway as Jack Rawson
Maie Baird as Marion Oldham
John de Lacey as Frederich Schmidt/Fred Smith
P.G. Sadler as Colonel Oldham
Olga Willard-Turton as Joyce (credited as Olga Willard)
Rock Phillips as Carl Reichardt
Charles Villiers as Wilhelm Heidel
Lily Rochefort as Aunt Lily
Maud Styan as maid
Claude Turton
Charles Beetham

Chapter titles
Magnificent island scene
The raft at sea
The ride for life
The landing of the enemy
The sacking of the township
The massacre of inhabitants
The news reaches Sydney
Our troops to the rescue
The loyal strikers
The hand-to-hand fight
Victory.

Production
The film was written by Barrett and Rock Phillips, a stage designer for J. C. Williamson Ltd who also appeared in the cast along with his wife Lily Rochefort.

Shooting began in early 1917 with the co-operation of the Commonwealth Defence Department and the New South Wales Recruiting Committee.

Charles Villiers was injured during the shoot when he fell down a 30-foot cliff. He was hospitalised for two weeks.

Reception
Despite generally positive reviews, the film was not a success at the box office, most likely due to war weariness of the public.

See also
List of lost films

References

External links

Australia's Peril at National Film and Sound Archive
Australia's Peril at SilentEra

1917 films
Australian drama films
Australian silent feature films
Australian black-and-white films
Lost Australian films
1917 drama films
1917 lost films
Lost drama films
Australian World War I films
Films directed by Franklyn Barrett
Silent drama films